Narayani Shastri  is an Indian television and theatre actress known for her roles in Kyunki Saas Bhi Kabhi Bahu Thi as Kesar Anupam Kapadia, Piya Ka Ghar as Rimjhim Avinash Sharma, Namak Haraam as Swati Karan Sehgal, Rishton Ka Chakravyuh as Satrupa singh Aapki Nazron Ne Samjha as Rajvee Rawal and Nazar as Devika/Juhi's mother.

Personal life 
Shastri was in a long-term relationship with co-star Gaurav Chopra with whom she participated in Nach Baliye 2. Narayani married Steven Graver in 2015.

Career
Shastri made her debut in the DD National's Kahani Saat Pheron Ki. She played the lead role in Piya Ka Ghar as Rimjhim, and replaced Neha Mehta to play Mamta in Zee TV's Mamta.  Narayani played the role of Tulsi's sister Kesar in Star Plus' Kyunki Saas Bhi Kabhi Bahu Thi. She played the character Tashu, Abhay's evil wife in Sony TV's Kkusum.

In 2017, she played the role of powerful business woman Satrupa in Star Plus' show Rishton Ka Chakravyuh.

Filmography

Television

Films

Web series

References

External links

 
 

Actresses from Pune
Indian television actresses
Living people
Actresses in Hindi television
21st-century Indian actresses
1968 births